Elachista triangulifera is a moth of the family Elachistidae. It is found in Oregon.

The ground colour of the forewings is whitish, densely dusted with grey scales. This dusting is weaker along the fold. The hindwings are grey and the underside of the wings is dark chocolate brown.

Etymology
The species name is derived from Latin triangulus and -fera (meaning bearing a triangle).

References

Moths described in 1997
triangulifera
Endemic fauna of Oregon
Moths of North America